Machana Ronald Shamukuni is a Botswana politician that has served as the Minister of Justice since the department's creation in 2022. He is a member of the National Assembly for the constituency of Chobe.

Career 
Shamukuni was elected to represent Chobe in the National Assembly in the 2014 general election when he defeated BCP candidate Gibson Nshimwe, receiving 4,114 votes over Nshimwe's 3,166. During his first term, Shamukuni was appointed Assistant Minister of Presidential Affairs. He won reelection in 2019 against UDC candidate Simasiku Mapulanga, receiving 4,575 votes over Mapulanga's 3,200. When his second term began, President Mokgweetsi Masisi did not retain him in the new cabinet. In January 2022, Masisi appointed Shamukuni as the Minister of Employment, Labour Productivity and Skills Development. Later that year, Masisi appointed Shamukuni as minister of the newly created Ministry of Justice.

References 

21st-century Botswana politicians
Justice ministers of Botswana
Labour Ministers of Botswana
Living people
Year of birth missing (living people)